Urduliz is a municipality located in northern Biscay, Spain. While connected to Greater Bilbao both by the Bilbao metro and BizkaiBus, the municipality is part of Mungialdea.  The municipality shows a mixture of industrial and rural qualities, being divided in three separate villages or neighbourhoods. According to the 2019 census, it has 4,456 inhabitants.

References

External links
 URDULIZ in the Bernardo Estornés Lasa - Auñamendi Encyclopedia (Euskomedia Fundazioa) 

Municipalities in Biscay